Justice Morrison may refer to:

Frank B. Morrison Jr., associate justice of the Montana Supreme Court
Robert F. Morrison, chief justice of the Supreme Court of California